Juan Ángel Esparza (born May 6, 1973, in Montemorelos, Nuevo León, Mexico) is a Mexican actor.

Esparza debuted as an actor in 1992 on the telenovela Las secretas intenciones and continued with others such as Rencor apasionado, Tres mujeres, Amigas y rivales, Las vías del amor and Cuidado con el ángel.

He has also participated in series such as Bienes raíces, Central de Abasto, Mujer, casos de la vida real and Tiempo final.

Filmography

References

External links 
 

1973 births
Living people
Mexican male telenovela actors
Mexican male television actors
Mexican male film actors
Mexican male stage actors
20th-century Mexican male actors
21st-century Mexican male actors
Male actors from Nuevo León
People from Nuevo León